Heynen is a surname. Notable people with the surname include:

 Bryan Heynen (born 1997), Belgian footballer 
 Hilde Heynen (born 1959), Belgian academic
 Julia Heynen, American actress
 Vital Heynen (born 1969), Belgian volleyball coach and player

See also
 Heynes